Gary Tharaldson (born 1945) is an American entrepreneur and founder of the Tharaldson Companies. As of 2019, Tharaldson is the wealthiest individual in North Dakota, and the state's only billionaire.

Gary Tharaldson was born in and grew up in Dazey, North Dakota.   He graduated from Valley City State University with degrees in Business Administration and Physical Education.  He did graduate work at North Dakota State University in Fargo and taught school in Leonard, North Dakota for two years. He has been extensively involved at the University of Mary in Bismarck, North Dakota, lending his name and acumen to the University's "Gary Tharaldson School of Business", serving for a time on the University's Board of Trustees, and receiving an honorary doctorate from the University in 2018.

Tharaldson Hospitality builds and operates hotels across the United States. Tharaldson Companies was established in 1982 by Gary Tharaldson, with the purchase of a Super 8 Motel in Valley City, North Dakota. Gary Tharaldson is listed among the 1998 Forbes 400 Richest Americans, and his organization, since its establishment, has grown to be one of America's largest developers of new hotels. In 2003, Tharaldson was inducted into the Scandinavian-American Hall of Fame.

In March 2006, the Tharaldson Family sold 130 hotels to the Whitehall Real Estate Fund (Division of Goldman Sachs) for $1.2 billion in cash. The proceeds from the transaction have mostly been invested in key land properties around the nation.  The assets are being managed by Diversified Asset Management based in Las Vegas, Nevada.

References

External links
Tharaldson Companies website
Current Forbes 400 List
Article about Gary Tharaldson in the Fargo daily newspaper, Fargo Forum  

American real estate businesspeople
American chief executives
People from Fargo, North Dakota
Living people
1945 births
Date of birth missing (living people)
Place of birth missing (living people)
Valley City State University alumni
North Dakota State University alumni
American people of Norwegian descent
20th-century American businesspeople